The Nihotupu Tramline is a  long industrial narrow gauge railway at Nihotupu in the Waitākere Ranges south-west of Auckland in New Zealand, which is being used since 1907 for building and maintaining the dam and water pipeline at the Upper Nihotupu Reservoir. It was used until 24 November 2014 also by the Rainforest Express for tourist excursions, which have been indefinitely ceased due to a risk assessment.

Location 
The route includes 10 tunnels and 9 bridges.

Rolling stock 
It has enclosed cabs at both ends with sliding doors for the driver.

Accidents 
The Rain Forest Express had conveyed in excess of 58,000 passengers, since it started transporting tourists. There had been 3 accidents with injured passengers during that period of time, two of whom required hospital treatment. Another serious accident happened on 4 May 2002, when a child fell from a carriage of Rain Forest Express Train No 1337, while it was travelling through Tunnel 29. The child was seriously injured, when he was crushed between the 610 mm diameter water pipeline and the moving train, causing a derailment of one bogie of each of two carriages. None of the previous accidents had involved passengers falling from the train. Subsequently, a barrier was installed on the open side of the carriages, so that children standing on the seats could not fall out. As a conclusion of a risk assessment, a stiffening aluminium rod was to be installed at the top of the vinyl doors of the carriages.

See also 
 Waitakere Tramline

References 

Rail transport in New Zealand
2 ft gauge railways in New Zealand
Waitākere Ranges